Center S (Центр С in Cyrillic script) was a secret, joint, Russian–Syrian  signals intelligence 'spy' post near al-Harra in southwestern Syria close to the Israeli-occupied Golan Heights.

Presumably existing since before 2006, it was over-run by Free Syrian Army rebels on 5 October 2014 during the Daraa offensive (October 2014). It was recaptured by SAA during the 2018 Southern Syria offensive.

Site and purpose
The Center was on the peak of Tel al-Hara mountain, adjacent to the town of al-Harra in the western part of the al-Sanamayn District of the Daraa Governorate, near the Quneitra Governorate. The Center was operated on a joint Russian-Syrian basis, with Syrian Intelligence and the OSNAZ unit of the Russian GRU monitoring signals intelligence from Syrian rebels, as well as the Israel Defense Forces.

Overrun and recapture
On October 5, 2014 the Center was overrun by rebels affiliated with the Free Syrian Army in the Daraa offensive. All Russian personnel had been evacuated, along with the more sensitive equipment. Center S was recaptured by SAA during the 2018 Southern Syria offensive.

Other centers
At least two other Russian intelligence centers are assumed to be located inside Syria.

See also
Russian naval facility in Tartus
Russia's role in the Syrian Civil War

References

Signals intelligence
Russian intelligence agencies
Russia–Syria relations
Military installations of Russia in Syria